Post- (stylized in all caps) is the third solo album by American singer-songwriter Jeff Rosenstock. It was released on January 1, 2018, without any promotional lead-up. The album was released on Polyvinyl Record Co. in the United States and by Specialist Subject Records in the United Kingdom.

Much of Post- was written in the Catskill Mountains shortly after the 2016 presidential election. The resulting songs are "chiefly concerned with losing hope in your country, yourself, and those around you." The album was primarily recorded at Atomic Garden Studios in Palo Alto, California in late November and early December 2017. Additional recording took place at the Quote Unquote Records offices in Brooklyn, New York and in East Durham, New York. Guests on the album include Rosenstock's bandmate in Antarctigo Vespucci, Chris Farren; as well as frequent collaborator Dan Potthast, American singer-songwriter Laura Stevenson and Canadian punk rock band PUP. Farren, Stevenson and PUP recorded their parts for the album from their homes.

Ten percent of proceeds from any digital sales made from the album are being donated to Defend Puerto Rico, a charity assisting with disaster relief in Puerto Rico.

Reception

Post- was acclaimed by contemporary music critics upon its initial release.  At Metacritic, which assigns a normalized rating out of 100 to reviews from mainstream publications, the album received an average score of 88, based on 11 reviews, indicating "universal acclaim".

Reviewing the album for AllMusic, writer Timothy Monger wrote that "While this may seem unerringly bleak, Post- is actually a pretty wild ride... Perhaps surprisingly so, Post- is also one of his most accessible solo outings yet."

Track listing

Personnel
Death Rosenstock
 Jeff Rosenstock – lead vocals, guitars, keyboards, piano, percussion, layout, design, additional recording
 John DeDomenici – bass, backing vocals
 Mike Huguenor – guitars, backing vocals
 Kevin Higuchi – drums, percussion

Additional personnel
 Chris Farren – backing vocals (2, 6 and 10), additional recording
 Laura Stevenson – backing vocals (tracks 2, 6, 9 and 10), additional recording
 Dan Potthast – lap steel
 Nestor Chumak – Additional recording
 PUP – backing vocals, claps, additional recording
 Gilbert Armendariz – backing vocals, claps
 Angelina Banda – backing vocals, claps
 Sim Castro – backing vocals, claps
 Laura Hammond – backing vocals, claps
 Julia Loan – backing vocals, claps
 Neal Sharma – backing vocals, claps
 Shannon Toombs – backing vocals, claps
 Jack Shirley – recording, engineering, production, mixing, mastering
 Hiro Tanaka – photography

Charts

References

2018 albums
Jeff Rosenstock albums
Polyvinyl Record Co. albums